East Carpathians Protected Landscape Area is a protected landscape area in north-eastern Slovakia, in the Prešov Region, in the Carpathian Mountains. The PLA occupies a slice of land along with the border with Poland. The park was first created in 1977, when it was originally larger than today, occupying area of 968.1 km2 (373.8 sq mi) until 1997, when the Poloniny National Park was created in the eastern part, reducing the area into 253.07 km2 (97.7 sq mi).

Biology
Beech forests are dominant in the park, with the corresponding plant and animal associations. Original growth forests constitute an ideal environment for protected or threatened species, such as the gray wolf, lynx, bear, otter and others.

External links
  Protected landscape area Východné Karpaty at Slovakia.travel
 East Carpathians Protected Landscape Area at The Slovak Nature Conservancy

IUCN Category V
Protected areas of Slovakia
Protected areas established in 1977
Protected areas of the Eastern Carpathians
Geography of Prešov Region
Tourist attractions in Prešov Region